The Hiller Aviation Museum is an aircraft history museum located at the San Carlos Airport in San Carlos, California. The museum was founded by Stanley Hiller in June 1998. and is endowed by members of the Hiller family. It specializes in Northern California aircraft history and helicopter history. The museum is also an affiliate within the Smithsonian Affiliations program.

Permanent exhibits

This museum has more than 50 aerospace vehicles along with companion descriptive displays concerning the history of flight. Some of the exhibits include:

 The Hiller XH-44 (replica), first coaxial helicopter to fly in the US
 The Hiller Flying Platform, an experimental aircraft from 1955 to give a single passenger low-altitude flight
 The front 45 feet of a Boeing 747
Fairchild 24
Stearman-Hammond Y-1, a mid-1930s trainer also used as a remotely piloted aircraft
 The Rutan Defiant, Burt Rutan's personal homebuilt airplane.
 A Grumman HU-16 Albatross that was the first to circumnavigate the earth.
 The NASA AD-1 oblique wing research aircraft.

Annual airshow

This museum sponsored Vertical Challenge, an annual all-helicopter airshow from 2000-2010, and a final one in 2012. In 2011 and 2016 an aviation festival event called Heli-Fest was held instead.

See also

 Coleopter
 List of aerospace museums

References

Sources
Fact Sheet
Stanley Van Winkle Hiller 1888-1968
Hiller Aviation Museum: Fascinating Family Fun

External links

 Hiller Aviation Museum official website

Aerospace museums in California
Museums in San Mateo County, California
Smithsonian Institution affiliates
1998 establishments in California